Róbert Klučiar (born 2 March 1987 in Banská Bystrica) is a Slovak football defender who currently plays for the 5. Divisjon club Hitra.

Limerick
In July 2012 Limerick announced the signing of former Slovakian under-20 international Róbert Klučiar from Czech side FC Zenit Čáslav. He made his debut for Limerick against SD Galway on 20 July 2012. He played a friendly match against Manchester City on 5 August 2012, in which Limerick lost 0-4. In 2013, he signed for Hitra.

Honours
Limerick
League of Ireland First Division (1): 2012

References

External links

1987 births
Living people
Slovak footballers
Association football defenders
FK Dukla Banská Bystrica players
FK Železiarne Podbrezová players
Limerick F.C. players
Slovak Super Liga players
Expatriate footballers in the Czech Republic
Expatriate association footballers in the Republic of Ireland
Sportspeople from Banská Bystrica
Expatriate footballers in Norway